The Sid El-Antri massacre took place on the night of 23–24 December 1997 in two small villages near Tiaret, Algeria.  The death toll is unclear; Reuters cites "at least 80", or 48 according to the government. Le Jeune Independent reported 117 people were killed and 11 abducted by terrorists, and a timeline gives 53 (including 15 children) killed in Sidi el-Antri (or Sidi el-Antar, Sidi Lamri) and 28 in Shari. On the same day, 11 were killed further away in the Bainem area near Algiers. A few days later, another 26 civilians were killed in the Zouabria massacre, also near Tiaret.

See also
List of massacres in Algeria

References

External links
Le Jeune Independent (quoted)
Turkish Daily News
Algeria timeline

Algerian massacres of the 1990s
Massacres in 1997
1997 in Algeria
Conflicts in 1997
December 1997 events in Africa